The 2012–13 Orlando Magic season was the 24th season of the franchise in the National Basketball Association (NBA). The Magic were eliminated from playoff contention with their 115–109 loss to the Milwaukee Bucks on March 17, 2013. This marked the first time since the 2005–06 season that the Magic failed to qualify for the playoffs. Ending the season with a 20–62 record, the Magic finished with the worst record in the NBA. This was also the worst record posted by the Magic since their inaugural season in 1989–90. This was also the first season since 2003-04 that All-Star center Dwight Howard was not on the roster, as he was traded to the Los Angeles Lakers (his first stint) on August 10, 2012.

Key dates
 June 28: The 2012 NBA draft took place at Prudential Center in Newark, New Jersey.

Draft picks

Roster

Pre-season

|- style="background:#fcc;"
| 1
| October 7
| @ New Orleans
| 
| E'Twaun Moore (16)
| Nikola Vučević (9)
| E'Twaun Moore (7)
| Mexico City Arena18,133
| 0–1
|- style="background:#fcc;"
| 2
| October 11
| Philadelphia
| 
| Glen Davis (16)
| Glen Davis (12)
| Gustavo Ayón, JJ Redick (5)
| Amway Center18,106
| 0–2
|- style="background:#fcc;"
| 3
| October 15
| @ Cleveland
| 
| Glen Davis (27)
| DeQuan Jones,Andrew Nicholson (9)
| JJ Redick (8)
| Quicken Loans Arena5,219
| 0–3
|- style="background:#fcc;"
| 4
| October 16
| @ Detroit
| 
| DeQuan Jones (22)
| Gustavo Ayón (10)
| E'Twaun Moore (6)
| The Palace of Auburn Hills9,229
| 0–4
|- style="background:#cfc;"
| 5
| October 19
| Indiana
| 
| Glen Davis (21)
| Hedo Türkoğlu,Nikola Vučević (7)
| JJ Redick (8)
| Amway Center17,204
| 1–4
|- style="background:#cfc;"
| 6
| October 21
| San Antonio
| 
| Andrew Nicholson (18)
| Nikola Vučević (9)
| E'Twaun Moore (8)
| Amway Arena17,012
| 2–4
|- style="background:#fcc;"
| 7
| October 24
| @ Memphis
| 
| JJ Redick (23)
| Nikola Vučević (9)
| Jameer Nelson (7)
| FedExForum10,263
| 2–5
|- style="background:#fcc;"
| 8
| October 26
| Houston
| 
| E'Twaun Moore (18)
| Nikola Vučević (14)
| Kyle O'Quinn (5)
| Amway Center17,109
| 2–6

Regular season

Standings

Game log

|- style="background:#cfc;"
| 1
| November 2
| Denver
| 
| Glen Davis (29)
| Glen Davis (10)
| Jameer Nelson (7)
| Amway Center18,846
| 1–0
|- style="background:#cfc;"
| 2
| November 4
| Phoenix
| 
| JJ Redick (24)
| Nikola Vučević (13)
| Moore & Redick (6)
| Amway Center17,022
| 2–0
|- style="background:#fcc;"
| 3
| November 6
| @ Chicago
| 
| Arron Afflalo (28)
| Davis & Vučević (10)
| JJ Redick (7)
| United Center21,216
| 2–1
|- style="background:#fcc;"
| 4
| November 7
| @ Minnesota
| 
| JJ Redick (16)
| Glen Davis (6)
| Davis, Moore, & Smith (4)
| Target Center17,121
| 2–2
|- style="background:#fcc;"
| 5
| November 9
| Brooklyn
| 
| E'Twaun Moore (18)
| Afflalo & Vučević (5)
| Davis & Moore (5)
| Amway Center17,532
| 2–3
|- style="background:#fcc;"
| 6
| November 11
| @ Brooklyn
| 
| Afflalo & Davis (19)
| Nikola Vučević (12)
| JJ Redick (9)
| Barclays Center16,523
| 2–4
|- style="background:#fcc;"
| 7
| November 13
| New York
| 
| JJ Redick (18)
| Nikola Vučević (10)
| E'Twaun Moore (8)
| Amway Center18,846
| 2–5
|- style="background:#cfc;"
| 8
| November 16
| @ Detroit
| 
| JJ Redick (23)
| Davis & Vučević (13)
| Jameer Nelson (10)
| The Palace of Auburn Hills11,594
| 3–5
|- style="background:#fcc;"
| 9
| November 18
| @ Toronto
| 
| Davis & Moore (16)
| Glen Davis (12)
| Jameer Nelson (9)
| Air Canada Centre18,702
| 3–6
|- style="background:#fcc;"
| 10
| November 19
| @ Atlanta
| 
| Glen Davis (11)
| Nikola Vučević (13)
| E'Twaun Moore (4)
| Philips Arena15,006
| 3–7
|- style="background:#cfc;"
| 11
| November 21
| Detroit
| 
| Andrew Nicholson (15)
| Glen Davis (14)
| Nelson & Redick (7)
| Amway Center17,199
| 4–7
|- style="background:#cfc;"
| 12
| November 23
| Cleveland
| 
| Jameer Nelson (22)
| Davis & Vučević (8)
| Nelson & Redick (6)
| Amway Center17,334
| 5–7
|- style="background:#fcc;"
| 13
| November 25
| Boston
| 
| Jameer Nelson (20)
| Josh McRoberts (14)
| Arron Afflalo (6)
| Amway Center17,307
| 5–8
|- style="background:#fcc;"
| 14
| November 28
| San Antonio
| 
| Arron Afflalo (16)
| DeQuan Jones (6)
| JJ Redick (4)
| Amway Center17,271
| 5–9
|- style="background:#fcc;"
| 15
| November 30
| Brooklyn
| 
| Glen Davis (16)
| Maurice Harkless (7)
| Moore & Redick (4)
| Amway Center17,103
| 5–10

|- style="background:#cfc;"
| 16
| December 2
| @ L.A. Lakers
| 
| Arron Afflalo (30)
| Davis & Vučević (12)
| Jameer Nelson (13)
| Staples Center18,997
| 6–10
|- style="background:#cfc;"
| 17
| December 3
| @ Golden State
| 
| Davis & Nelson (24)
| Nikola Vučević (15)
| Jameer Nelson (9)
| Oracle Arena18,117
| 7–10
|- style="background:#fcc;"
| 18
| December 5
| @ Utah
| 
| Glen Davis (18)
| Nikola Vučević (16)
| Jameer Nelson (5)
| EnergySolutions Arena18,078
| 7–11
|- style="background:#fcc;"
| 19
| December 7
| @ Sacramento
| 
| Glen Davis (20)
| Glen Davis (11)
| Jameer Nelson (6)
| Sleep Train Arena16,305
| 7–12
|- style="background:#cfc;"
| 20
| December 9
| @ Phoenix
| 
| JJ Redick (20)
| Vučević & Nicholson (9)
| JJ Redick (9)
| US Airways Center13,565
| 8–12
|- style="background:#fcc;"
| 21
| December 12
| Atlanta
| 
| Arron Afflalo (16)
| Davis & Nicholson (7)
| Afflalo, Ayón, & Moore (4)
| Amway Center16,992
| 8–13
|- style="background:#cfc;"
| 22
| December 14
| Golden State
| 
| JJ Redick (16)
| Nikola Vučević (17)
| Jameer Nelson (11)
| Amway Center17,040
| 9–13
|- style="background:#cfc;"
| 23
| December 15
| @ Charlotte
| 
| Afflalo & Davis (20)
| Nikola Vučević (13)
| Jameer Nelson (6)
| Time Warner Cable Arena16,217
| 10–13
|- style="background:#cfc;"
| 24
| December 17
| Minnesota
| 
| Glen Davis (28)
| Nikola Vučević (11)
| Jameer Nelson (12)
| Amway Center16,992
| 11–13
|- style="background:#cfc;"
| 25
| December 19
| Washington
| 
| JJ Redick (17)
| Nikola Vučević (13)
| Jameer Nelson (5)
| Amway Center16,893
| 12–13
|- style="background:#fcc;"
| 26
| December 21
| @ Toronto
| 
| Arron Afflalo (26)
| Gustavo Ayón (13)
| Jameer Nelson (7)
| Air Canada Centre18,391
| 12–14
|- style="background:#fcc;"
| 27
| December 23
| Utah
| 
| Arron Afflalo (20)
| Nikola Vučević (16)
| Jameer Nelson (9)
| Amway Center17,721
| 12–15
|- style="background:#fcc;"
| 28
| December 26
| New Orleans
| 
| Jameer Nelson (28)
| Nikola Vučević (9)
| Jameer Nelson (10)
| Amway Center18,846
| 12–16
|- style="background:#fcc;"
| 29
| December 28
| @ Washington
| 
| Arron Afflalo (26)
| Nikola Vučević (11)
| Jameer Nelson (8)
| Verizon Center15,789
| 12–17
|- style="background:#fcc;"
| 30
| December 29
| Toronto
| 
| Andrew Nicholson (22)
| Nikola Vučević (9)
| Afflalo & Smith (6)
| Amway Center18,846
| 12–18
|- style="background:#fcc;"
| 31
| December 31
| Miami
| 
| Arron Afflalo (28)
| Nikola Vučević (29)
| Hedo Türkoğlu (8)
| Amway Center19,311
| 12–19

|- style="background:#fcc;"
| 32
| January 2
| Chicago
| 
| Jameer Nelson (32)
| Nikola Vučević (12)
| Josh McRoberts (5)
| Amway Center18,846
| 12–20
|- style="background:#fcc;"
| 33
| January 5
| New York
| 
| Afflalo & Nelson (29)
| Nikola Vučević (18)
| Jameer Nelson (8)
| Amway Center19,171
| 12–21
|- style="background:#fcc;"
| 34
| January 7
| @ Portland
| 
| JJ Redick (29)
| Nikola Vučević (13)
| Jameer Nelson (12)
| Rose Garden19,560
| 12–22
|- style="background:#fcc;"
| 35
| January 9
| @ Denver
| 
| Jameer Nelson (20)
| Nikola Vučević (14)
| Jameer Nelson (8)
| Pepsi Center15,084
| 12–23
|- style="background:#cfc;"
| 36
| January 12
| @ L.A. Clippers
| 
| Arron Afflalo (30)
| Nikola Vučević (15)
| Jameer Nelson (9)
| Staples Center19,060
| 13–23
|- style="background:#fcc;"
| 37
| January 14
| @ Washington
| 
| Jameer Nelson (19)
| Nikola Vučević (13)
| Jameer Nelson (12)
| Verizon Center14,648
| 13–24
|- style="background:#cfc;"
| 38
| January 16
| Indiana
| 
| Nikola Vučević (16)
| Nikola Vučević (15)
| Nelson & Redick (6)
| Amway Center17,499
| 14–24
|- style="background:#fcc;"
| 39
| January 18
| Charlotte
| 
| Arron Afflalo (23)
| Nikola Vučević (9)
| Jameer Nelson (7)
| Amway Center17,598
| 14–25
|- style="background:#fcc;"
| 40
| January 20
| Dallas
| 
| Glen Davis (24)
| Nikola Vučević (11)
| Glen Davis (6)
| Amway Center18,192
| 14–26
|- style="background:#fcc;"
| 41
| January 22
| @ Detroit
| 
| JJ Redick (26)
| Afflalo & Vučević (9)
| Jameer Nelson (9)
| The Palace of Auburn Hills11,798
| 14–27
|- style="background:#fcc;"
| 42
| January 24
| Toronto
| 
| Nikola Vučević (19)
| Nikola Vučević (14)
| Jameer Nelson (11)
| Amway Center17,145
| 14–28
|- style="background:#fcc;"
| 43
| January 27
| Detroit
| 
| JJ Redick (31)
| Nikola Vučević (17)
| Jameer Nelson (8)
| Amway Center17,959
| 14–29
|- style="background:#fcc;"
| 44
| January 28
| @ Brooklyn
| 
| Nikola Vučević (18)
| Nikola Vučević (9)
| JJ Redick (10)
| Barclays Center16,480
| 14–30
|- style="background:#fcc;"
| 45
| January 30
| @ New York
| 
| JJ Redick (29)
| Nikola Vučević (11)
| Jameer Nelson (9)
| Madison Square Garden19,033
| 14–31

|- style="background:#fcc;"
| 46
| February 1
| @ Boston
| 
| JJ Redick (15)
| Nikola Vučević (14)
| JJ Redick (5)
| TD Garden18,624
| 14–32
|- style="background:#fcc;"
| 47
| February 2
| @ Milwaukee
| 
| Nikola Vučević (20)
| Maurice Harkless (14)
| JJ Redick (8)
| BMO Harris Bradley Center14,321
| 14–33
|- style="background:#fcc;"
| 48
| February 4
| @ Philadelphia
| 
| E'Twaun Moore (18)
| Nikola Vučević (14)
| McRoberts & Türkoğlu (6)
| Wells Fargo Center14,630
| 14–34
|- style="background:#fcc;"
| 49
| February 6
| L.A. Clippers
| 
| Jameer Nelson (18)
| Nikola Vučević (14)
| E'Twaun Moore (5)
| Amway Center17,995
| 14–35
|- style="background:#fcc;"
| 50
| February 8
| @ Cleveland
| 
| Nikola Vučević (25)
| Nikola Vučević (13)
| Jameer Nelson (13)
| Quicken Loans Arena14,073
| 14–36
|- style="background:#cfc;"
| 51
| February 10
| Portland
| 
| JJ Redick (22)
| Nikola Vučević (19)
| Jameer Nelson (15)
| Amway Center17,966
| 15–36
|- style="background:#fcc;"
| 52
| February 13
| Atlanta
| 
| Nelson & Nicholson (10)
| Kyle O'Quinn (8)
| Jameer Nelson (4)
| Amway Center17,649
| 15–37
|- align="center"
|colspan="9" bgcolor="#bbcaff"|All-Star Break
|- style="background:#fcc;"
| 53
| February 19
| Charlotte
| 
| Afflalo & Vučević (18)
| Andrew Nicholson (12)
| Jameer Nelson (6)
| Amway Center17,037
| 15–38
|- style="background:#fcc;"
| 54
| February 20
| @ Dallas
| 
| Arron Afflalo (21)
| Nikola Vučević (13)
| Afflalo & Nelson (7)
| American Airlines Center19,965
| 15–39
|- style="background:#fcc;"
| 55
| February 22
| @ Memphis
| 
| Arron Afflalo (20)
| Nikola Vučević (11)
| Afflalo & Moore (7)
| FedExForum17,669
| 15–40
|- style="background:#fcc;"
| 56
| February 23
| Cleveland
| 
| Arron Afflalo (16)
| O'Quinn & Vučević (7)
| Beno Udrih (7)
| Amway Center17,171
| 15–41
|- style="background:#cfc;"
| 57
| February 26
| @ Philadelphia
| 
| Afflalo & Harris (16)
| Nikola Vučević (19)
| E'Twaun Moore (10)
| Wells Fargo Center18,432
| 16–41
|- style="background:#fcc;"
| 58
| February 27
| Sacramento
| 
| Tobias Harris (23)
| Arron Afflalo (7)
| Beno Udrih (8)
| Amway Center16,722
| 16–42

|- style="background:#fcc;"
| 59
| March 1
| Houston
| 
| Tobias Harris (27)
| Harris & Vučević (10)
| E'Twaun Moore (11)
| Amway Center16,677
| 16–43
|- style="background:#fcc;"
| 60
| March 3
| Memphis
| 
| Afflalo, Moore, & Nicholson (12)
| Maurice Harkless (6)
| E'Twaun Moore (6)
| Amway Center16,020
| 16–44
|- style="background:#cfc;"
| 61
| March 4
| @ New Orleans
| 
| Arron Afflalo (26)
| Nikola Vučević (11)
| Jameer Nelson (7)
| New Orleans Arena11,050
| 17–44
|- style="background:#fcc;"
| 62
| March 6
| @ Miami
| 
| Nikola Vučević (25)
| Nikola Vučević (21)
| Jameer Nelson (14)
| American Airlines Arena20,001
| 17–45
|- style="background:#fcc;"
| 63
| March 8
| Indiana
| 
| Arron Afflalo (19)
| Tobias Harris (8)
| Beno Udrih (7)
| Amway Center16,515
| 17–46
|- style="background:#cfc;"
| 64
| March 10
| Philadelphia
| 
| Jameer Nelson (24)
| Nikola Vučević (17)
| Jameer Nelson (10)
| Amway Center16,317
| 18–46
|- style="background:#fcc;"
| 65
| March 12
| L.A. Lakers
| 
| Jameer Nelson (21)
| Tobias Harris (15)
| Jameer Nelson (7)
| Amway Center19,287
| 18–47
|- style="background:#fcc;"
| 66
| March 15
| @ Oklahoma City
| 
| Jameer Nelson (26)
| Nikola Vučević (14)
| Jameer Nelson (7)
| Chesapeake Energy Arena18,203
| 18–48
|- style="background:#fcc;"
| 67
| March 17
| @ Milwaukee
| 
| Arron Afflalo (24)
| Nikola Vučević (15)
| Jameer Nelson (7)
| BMO Harris Bradley Center15,591
| 18–49
|- style="background:#fcc;"
| 68
| March 19
| @ Indiana
| 
| Afflalo & Harkless (10)
| Nikola Vučević (11)
| Arron Afflalo (3)
| Bankers Life Fieldhouse14,343
| 18–50
|- style="background:#fcc;"
| 69
| March 20
| @ New York
| 
| Harris & Nicholson (14)
| Kyle O'Quinn (14)
| Beno Udrih (8)
| Madison Square Garden19,033
| 18–51
|- style="background:#fcc;"
| 70
| March 22
| Oklahoma City
| 
| Maurice Harkless (25)
| Tobias Harris (15)
| Jameer Nelson (10)
| Amway Center17,429
| 18–52
|- style="background:#fcc;"
| 71
| March 25
| Miami
| 
| Jameer Nelson (27)
| Harkless & Moore (9)
| Jameer Nelson (12)
| Amway Center18,846
| 18–53
|- style="background:#fcc;"
| 72
| March 27
| @ Charlotte
| 
| Tobias Harris (29)
| Kyle O'Quinn (11)
| Jameer Nelson (11)
| Time Warner Cable Arena11,839
| 18–54
|- style="background:#cfc;"
| 73
| March 29
| Washington
| 
| Tobias Harris (30)
| Tobias Harris (11)
| Beno Udrih (9)
| Amway Center17,998
| 19–54
|- style="background:#fcc;"
| 74
| March 30
| @ Atlanta
| 
| Beno Udrih (20)
| Nikola Vučević (15)
| Beno Udrih (8)
| Philips Arena17,152
| 19–55

|- style="background:#fcc;"
| 75
| April 1
| @ Houston
| 
| Maurice Harkless (28)
| Nikola Vučević (13)
| Beno Udrih (10)
| Toyota Center16,273
| 19–56
|- style="background:#fcc;"
| 76
| April 3
| @ San Antonio
| 
| Maurice Harkless (18)
| Nikola Vučević (14)
| Beno Udrih (8)
| AT&T Center18,581
| 19–57
|- style="background:#fcc;"
| 77
| April 5
| @ Chicago
| 
| Beno Udrih (27)
| Nikola Vučević (15)
| Beno Udrih (7)
| United Center22,268
| 19–58
|- style="background:#fcc;"
| 78
| April 7
| @ Cleveland
| 
| Tobias Harris (26)
| Nikola Vučević (21)
| Udrih & Vučević (6)
| Quicken Loans Arena16,341
| 19–59
|- style="background:#cfc;"
| 79
| April 10
| Milwaukee
| 
| Harris &  Vučević (30)
| Nikola Vučević (20)
| Beno Udrih (11)
| Amway Center17,127
| 20–59
|- style="background:#fcc;"
| 80
| April 13
| Boston
| 
| Tobias Harris (22)
| Nikola Vučević (12)
| Beno Udrih (8)
| Amway Center17,422
| 20–60
|- style="background:#fcc;"
| 81
| April 15
| Chicago
| 
| Tobias Harris (20)
| Nikola Vučević (14)
| Tobias Harris (4)
| Amway Center17,297
| 20–61
|- style="background:#fcc;"
| 82
| April 17
| @ Miami
| 
| Nikola Vučević (20)
| Nikola Vučević (13)
| Beno Udrih (14)
| American Airlines Center19,949
| 20–62

Transactions

Overview

  Waived during the pre-season.

Trades

Free Agency

References

Orlando Magic seasons
Orlando Magic
2012 in sports in Florida
2013 in sports in Florida